The L. J. Arthur House is located in Lancaster, Wisconsin.

History
L. J. Arthur was a local attorney. The house was listed on the National Register of Historic Places in 1980 and on the State Register of Historic Places in 1989.

References

Houses on the National Register of Historic Places in Wisconsin
National Register of Historic Places in Grant County, Wisconsin
Houses in Grant County, Wisconsin
Victorian architecture in Wisconsin
Brick buildings and structures
Houses completed in 1880